Salem Public Library may refer to:

Salem Public Library (Massachusetts)
Salem Public Library (Oregon)